Donauri was a Georgian noble family to which belonged two ruling princes of the eastern province of Kakheti in the ninth century, and which gave origin to the latter-day noble family of Vachnadze, and, possibly, to that of Babadishvili (Beburishvili).

According to the medieval Georgian chronicles, the Donauris originated in the district of Gardabani and grew up to virtual independence as the princes of Kakheti with the title of k'orepiskoposi (a title adapted from the Greek chorepiscopus, normally a rural bishop). The two princes of the Donauri family were: Samuel (r. 839-861) and Gabriel (r. 861-881).

See also 

Donaurov

References 

Noble families of Georgia (country)
Princes of Kakheti
Georgian-language surnames